James Marshall is a British television producer and creator known for his work on The American Dream Project, which was nominated for a 44th Daytime Creative Arts Emmy, and American Doers, which is hosted on People Entertainment Weekly Network as of April 2017. Both shows were produced through his company, Happy Marshall Productions.

Early life 
Marshall was born in London, England and raised in Royal Windsor by his single mother, Linda Anne Edwards. Marshall is the middle child of three with an older sister Julia Elizabeth Porter, and a young brother, Peter George Edwards.

Career 
In 2007, Marshall moved to New York to pursue his career in corporate America.

In 2012, Marshall created his current company, Happy Marshall Productions, which produces web based content that has been hosted on sites including Netflix, Amazon Prime, People.com, Hulu, and iTunes.

Shows

References 

British television producers
Year of birth missing (living people)
Living people
People from Windsor, Berkshire